Seite is a German word meaning side.

Seite may also refer to:

 Berndt Seite (born 1940), German politician
 SEITE, acronym for South East Institute for Theological Education, United Kingdom
 Seite an Seite, the seventh studio album by Austrian recording artist Christina Stürmer